Adriana Serra Zanetti and Antonella Serra Zanetti were the defending champions, but chose not to participate that year.

Maria Elena Camerin and Émilie Loit won in the final 6–3, 6–0 against Anastasia Rodionova and Galina Voskoboeva.

Seeds

  Maria Elena Camerin /  Émilie Loit (champions)
  Emmanuelle Gagliardi /  María Emilia Salerni (first round)
  Caroline Dhenin /  Mara Santangelo (first round)
  Klaudia Jans /  Alicja Rosolska (first round)

Draw

References

External links
 Main and Qualifying Draws

Singles
Tashkent Open
2005 in Uzbekistani sport